Zonata was a Swedish power metal band originating from Borås. They formed in 1998 and recorded three albums with label Century Media before calling a split up in 2003. Their lyrics draw heavily on mythology and life struggles. They are known by most for their heavy drums and cutting guitar riffs.

Members

Final lineup 
Johannes Nyberg - vocals and keyboards
John Nyberg - guitar
Niclas Karlsson - guitar
Mattias Asplund - bass
Mikael Hornqvist - drums

Former 
Johan Elving - bass (1998–1999)
Daniel Dalhqvist - drums (1998)
Henrik Carlsson - guitar (1998–2000)

The band broke up in 2003 when Johannes Nyberg and John Nyberg left the band.

Discography 
 Copenhagen Tapes (1998 Demo)
 Tunes of Steel (1999)
 Reality (2001)
 Buried Alive (2002)
 Exceptions (2007 - Compilation)

References

External links
 Myspace page

Swedish power metal musical groups
Musical groups established in 1998
Musical groups disestablished in 2003
Musical quintets